"Candidatus Desulforudis audaxviator" is a monospecific genus of bacteria that lives in groundwater at depths from  below the Earth's surface.

Etymology
The name comes from a quotation from Jules Verne's novel Journey to the Center of the Earth, where the hero, Professor Lidenbrock, finds a secret inscription in Latin: Descende, audax viator, et terrestre centrum attinges (Descend, bold traveller, and you will attain the center of the Earth).

Biology
Desulforudis audaxviator is the only bacterium found in water samples obtained  underground in the Mponeng gold mine in South Africa. Approximately four micrometres in length, it survives on chemical food sources derived from the radioactive decay of minerals in the surrounding rock. This makes it one of the few known organisms that does not depend on sunlight for nourishment, and the only species known to be alone in its ecosystem.   It has genes for extracting carbon from dissolved carbon dioxide and for nitrogen fixation. It may also have acquired genes from a species of archaea by horizontal gene transfer.

Analyses of water from the bacteriums' habitat show that the water is very old and has not been diluted by surface water, indicating the bacterium have been isolated from Earth's surface for several million years.
As the environment at that depth is so much like the early Earth, it may indicate what types of creatures existed before there was an oxygen atmosphere. Billions of years ago, some of the planet's first bacteria may have thrived in similar conditions. The newly discovered microbes could shed light on the origins of life on Earth.
Candidatus Desulforudis audaxviator (CDA) populations have a slow evolution rate which results in high genetic similarities as they underwent minimal evolution since their physical separation from their ancestral population. A striking morphological feature of the organism is the presence of gas vesicles (provide cells the ability to flow in fluid making the CDA spores with this feature able to spread to large distances), firstly distinguished from an early study of the closest relative of Desulforudis, Desulfotomaculum, which reported spores associated with gas vesicles and follow up research showing that Desulfotomaculum spores could survive harsh temperature conditions and spread to the cold marine sediments.

"Ca. D. audaxviator" is a Gram positive sulfate-reducing bacterium. The genome contains an unusual transposon and possesses many sites of insertion. Its complete intolerance of oxygen suggests long-term isolation. The hydrocarbons in that environment do not come from living organisms. The source of the hydrogen needed for their respiration comes from the decomposition of water by radioactive decay of uranium, thorium and potassium. The radiation allows for the production of sulphur compounds the bacteria can use as a high-energy food source.

"Ca. D. audaxviator" lives in a complete absence of organic compounds, light, and oxygen, in temperatures exceeding  and a pH of 9.3. The physiology that enables it to live in these extreme conditions is a tribute to its unusually large genome, consisting of 2157 genes instead of the 1500 of its peers. If conditions become unfavorable for normal life, "Ca. D. audaxviator" is able to form a bacterial endospore, safeguarding its DNA from heat, extreme pH, and the lack of water.

A 2021 study reported further findings in West Siberia as in Death Valley, California.

See also
 List of sequenced archaeal genomes
 AngloGold Ashanti, operator of the Mponeng gold mine
 List of bacterial orders
 List of bacteria genera

Notes

References

 
 Karnachuk, O. V., Frank, Y. A., Lukina, A. P., Kadnikov, V. V., Beletsky, A. V., Mardanov, A. V., & Ravin, N. V. (2019). Domestication of previously uncultivated Candidatus Desulforudis audaxviator from a deep aquifer in Siberia sheds light on its physiology and evolution. The ISME Journal, 13(8), 1947–1959. https://doi.org/10.1038/s41396-019-0402-3

Peptococcaceae
Sulphophiles
Lithophiles
Monotypic bacteria genera
Candidatus taxa